Alexander Stuart (c.1875 – 5 June 1954) was a Reform Party Member of Parliament in New Zealand.

He was elected to the Rangitikei electorate in the 1931 general election, but was defeated in 1935. He was awarded the King George V Silver Jubilee Medal in 1935.

References

1870s births
1954 deaths
Reform Party (New Zealand) MPs
New Zealand MPs for North Island electorates
Members of the New Zealand House of Representatives
Unsuccessful candidates in the 1935 New Zealand general election